Hollywood Horror is a Nancy Drew and Hardy Boys Supermystery crossover novel, published in 1994.

Plot summary
Nancy Drew goes to the City of Lights in California to witness the shooting of Sunny-Side Up, a spectacular sitcom and a ratings bonanza. But when a death threat goes out to Maria Devereaux, star of the show, Nancy promises to do whatever it takes to protect her from such dangers as crazed fans and violent stalkers. Meanwhile, the Hardys get to Hollywood too, to explore the all-new Hollywood Gold Studios theme park and the malfunctions it has experienced. As the case deepens, so does the connections, and the three realize they are trying to find the same culprit.

References

External links
Hollywood Horror at Fantastic Fiction
Supermystery series books

Supermystery
1994 American novels
1994 children's books
Hollywood novels